Colvin Wang (born ) is a former wushu taolu athlete from the United States of America. He won a gold medal at the 2013 World Games.

Career 
Wang started practicing wushu at the age of six under Lu Xiaolin. His first major international appearance was at the 2006 Pan American Wushu Championships in Toronto, Canada, where he won bronze medals in changquan, daoshu, and gunshu. He then competed at the 2007 World Wushu Championships in Beijing, China, where he placed sixth in jianshu and fifth in qiangshu. This qualified him for the 2008 Beijing Wushu Tournament where he was the youngest athlete of the competition and placed fifth in the men's jianshu and qiangshu combined event. He then appeared at the 2008 World Junior Wushu Championships in Bali, Indonesia, and won the silver medal in group A qiangshu. A year later, Wang competed at the 2009 World Wushu Championships in Toronto, Canada, and won a silver medal in qiangshu. Two years later, he was a triple medalist at the 2011 World Wushu Championships in Ankara, Turkey. His last competition was at the 2013 World Games in Cali, Colombia, where he won the gold medal in men's changquan. Wang is the second American taolu athlete behind Alfred Hsing to win a gold medal at a major international competition.

References

External links 

 Athlete profile at the 2008 Beijing Wushu Tournament

1992 births
Living people
American wushu practitioners
Competitors at the 2008 Beijing Wushu Tournament
World Games gold medalists
World Games medalists in wushu
Competitors at the 2013 World Games
University of Virginia alumni
Stanford University alumni
Sportspeople from Fairfax, Virginia